Agrococcus versicolor is a bacterium from the genus Agrococcus which has been isolated from the phyllosphere of potato plants.

References

Microbacteriaceae
Bacteria described in 2008